Chaim Sheba (born 1908, died 10 July 1971) was an Israeli physician, notable for being the founder of Sheba Medical Center.

Biography 
Chaim Scheiber (later Sheba) was born in Frasin, near Gurahumora, Bukovina, then in Austria-Hungary (now Suceava County, Romania), to the well known Scheiber Hasidic family, a descendant of the Hasidic court of Ruzhin. As a young child he studied in heder, a school for religious studies only. He transferred from there to the 8th grade in a secular school.  Influenced by his grandfather, he began medical studies in Cernăuți and completed such studies in Vienna in December 1932.
In the beginning of 1933, Sheba immigrated to Mandate Palestine.

Sheba died in 1971 of a heart attack.

Medical career
Until 1936, Sheba served as rural doctor and later in Beilinson Hospital. In 1942, he joined the Jewish Brigade as a doctor, joining the Haganah in 1947. From 1948 to 1950, he commanded the Medical Corps of the Israel Defense Forces (IDF), and became Director General of the Ministry of Health after leaving the IDF. He fulfilled this position until 1953, when he moved on to become the director of the Tel HaShomer Hospital (today Chaim Sheba Medical Center, named in his honor).

In addition, from 1949 Sheba served as Professor of Medicine at the Hebrew University of Jerusalem. He was one of the founders of the Tel Aviv University Medical School and served as a Vice-President of that University.  He also helped to establish medical schools in Jerusalem and in Haifa.

During his tenure as Director General, Sheba was responsible for managing the tinea capitis outbreak. The standard treatment at the time involved X-raying the head area. This treatment was eventually discovered to be harmful, and the event became a source of controversy.

Awards and recognition
In 1968, Sheba was awarded the Israel Prize, in medicine.

See also
List of Israel Prize recipients
Health care in Israel

References 

1908 births
1971 deaths
People from Frasin
Bukovina Jews
Ashkenazi Jews in Mandatory Palestine
Israeli Ashkenazi Jews
Israeli military doctors
Israel Prize in medicine recipients
Academic staff of the Hebrew University of Jerusalem
Israeli healthcare managers
Mandatory Palestine military personnel of World War II
Jewish Brigade personnel
Romanian emigrants to Mandatory Palestine